Marc Maurice Enfroy (born 1965) is an American composer, songwriter and producer who describes his music as "cinematic piano" due to its score-like, piano-driven nature.  Born into a musical family, he is the grandson of radio entertainer and Nashville Songwriters Hall of Fame inductee Bradley Kincaid, a.k.a. “The Kentucky Mountain Boy.” Enfroy has released several studio albums and is best known for his fifth album, "Crossroads", which peaked at number 2 on the Billboard New Age Albums Chart in August 2016  and was the fourth best-selling iTunes album in Metro Detroit for the week of August 4, 2016.

His debut release, Unbounded, earned the Zone Music Reporter Lifestyle Music Award for Best Neo-Classical Album of the Year in 2008.

Discography

Studio albums 
 2008 – "Unbounded"
 2009 – "Awakening" (also released as "Arising" on MG Music label)
 2011 – "Unconditional"
 2012 - "Dreams of the Forest"
 2016 - "Crossroads"
 2019 - "Surrounded"

Singles 
 2010 – "Acceptance"
 2016 - "Your Silence is a Razor (feat. Aili Laine)"
 2016 - "Fading White (feat. Lila Ives)"
 2016 - "Shed my Skin (feat. Lila Ives)"
 2019 - "Aotearoa"
 2019 - "Land of Fire and Ice"
 2019 - "Kilkenny Rain"
 2019 - "Flight of the Monarch"
 2019 - "Lavande de Provence"
 2020 - "Taken Away (Reprise)" 
 2020 - "Moonlit Dreams Reprise"
 2020 - "Melankholiya"
 2021 - "Je t'aime"
 2022 - "The Dance"
 2022 - "Before the Dawn (Solo Piano Reprise)"
 2022 - "Je t'aime (Extended Version)"
 2022 - "Us"
 2022 - "Miracle in the Glade (Felt Piano Reprise)"

References

External links 
 Official website
 Marc Enfroy on Pandora Radio
 YouTube

21st-century American pianists
20th-century American male musicians
21st-century American male musicians
Living people
1965 births
American male composers
20th-century American composers
Musicians from Michigan
New-age pianists
Composers for piano
20th-century American pianists
American male pianists